Tim Levins is a Canadian comic book artist who co-created The Copybook Tales with writer J. Torres. In 1998, he and Torres created Siren, a miniseries for Image Comics, and in 2008 they created The Family Dynamic for DC Comics. From 1999 to 2003 he was the penciller on
Batman: Gotham Adventures, working with writer Scott Peterson.

Levins has also illustrated such titles as Flinch, Justice League Adventures, Scooby-Doo and Amazing Spider-Man Family.

References

External links
 
 Tim Levin Comic Vine
 Tim Levins DeviantArt
 Tim Levins Lambiek
 Interview with Tim Levins at CBR Pipeline
 Batman: Gotham Adventures at Toon Zone

Canadian comics artists
Living people
Year of birth missing (living people)